Sean Patrick Pinney is an American cardiologist and the Director of both the Advanced Heart Failure and Cardiac Transplant Program and the Pulmonary Hypertension Program at Mount Sinai Medical Center in New York City.

He is an Associate Professor of Cardiology at Mount Sinai School of Medicine, the author of over 20 publications in peer-reviewed medical journals and of multiple book chapters. He lectures frequently on the topic of cardiovascular disease.

Biography
Pinney was born in St. Louis, Missouri, graduating from St. Louis Priory School in 1986; he received his undergraduate degree from Georgetown University in 1990 and graduated from Georgetown University School of Medicine in 1994. He completed a residency at Deaconess Hospital, in Boston, Massachusetts and was Chief Resident in Medicine at Beth Israel Deaconess Medical Center until 1998. He was a fellow in Congestive Heart Failure and Cardiac Transplants and Chief Fellow in Cardiovascular Medicine at Columbia Presbyterian Medical Center in New York.

His practice has a primary focus on the understanding and treatment of cardiac allograft vasculopathy, a condition affecting about half of all transplant recipients by their fifth year.

Pinney is a reviewer for the medical journals The Medical Letter, Mount Sinai Journal of Medicine, Nature Clinical Practice Cardiovascular Medicine, Transplantation and Transplant Immunology.

Awards and honors
2005 – Best Medical Grand Rounds 2004-05, Mount Sinai Medical Center
2000 – Young Investigator Award, New York Cardiological Society/New York Chapter American College of Cardiology
2000 – Cardiology Fellowship Research Award, Columbia University
1998 – Ivy DeFriez Award, Beth Israel Deaconess Medical Center
1995 – James L. Tullis, M.D. Book Award, Deaconess Hospital 
1994 – Pharmacology Research Award, Georgetown University

Memberships
Fellow, American College of Cardiology
American Heart Association
American Society of Transplantation
Heart Failure Society of America
International Society for Heart and Lung Transplantation
Pulmonary Hypertension Association
1996-1998, American College of Physicians
1995-1998, Massachusetts Medical Society
1992-1998, American Medical Association

Publications

References

External links
Mount Sinai Hospital
Mount Sinai School of Medicine
American College of Cardiology
American Heart Association
American Society of Transplantation

American cardiologists
American medical academics
Living people
People from St. Louis
Georgetown University School of Medicine alumni
Icahn School of Medicine at Mount Sinai faculty
Fellows of the American College of Cardiology
Year of birth missing (living people)